Avetec (the Advanced Virtual Engine Test Cell, Inc.) is a not-for-profit research organization located in Springfield, Ohio. Avetec is currently conducting modeling and simulation research that aims to reduce the cost and time it takes to design, develop and test new jet turbine engines for commerce and the military. 

Avetec leads a number of science and educational outreach initiatives, including the following:

Avetec’s Modeling and Simulation Research team works to enhance and develop advanced modeling and simulation techniques to gain a deeper understanding of the physics within engine systems.

Avetec's DICE (Data Intensive Computing Environment) group helps vendor and data center customers optimize technology investments for High Performance Computing (HPC) and Information Technology (IT).  

Avetec's Education team works with students from elementary school age through post-graduate school.  The education programs they offer focus on the fields of Science, Technology, Engineering and Mathematics (STEM). In education, Avetec is working to help create a future workforce that is knowledgeable in the STEM fields to address the critical need for the U.S. to have a creative, cohesive and comprehensive STEM education nationwide in order to remain competitive. Avetec’s approach uses the wisdom from the National Research by focusing on internships and other hands-on, project-based learning opportunities for students to gain experience in STEM fields.

Location 

Avetec broke ground on a headquarters building at Springfield’s NextEdge Applied Research and Technology Park in October 2006. It includes Avetec’s headquarters, computer modeling and simulation environment, the Center for Condition-Based Management and conference space.
The design and construction of the building was funded by a $9.9 million grant from the United States Department of Energy, which was secured by the help of U.S. Congressman Dave Hobson. 

Avetec’s address is 4170 Allium Court, Springfield, Ohio 45505.

Featured Articles
Avetec has been featured in the following magazines:

 Aviation Week, January 2007
  Aerospace America, February 2009

External links
 Avetec website
 DICE Program website

References 

Organizations based in Ohio